The two Spains is a phrase from a short poem by Spanish poet Antonio Machado. The phrase, referring to the left-right political divisions that later led to the Spanish Civil War, originated in a short, untitled poem, number LIII of his Proverbios y Cantares (Proverbs and Songs).

Antonio Machado himself is an example of this split.
While he wrote a poem to honor the Communist General Enrique Líster, his brother Manuel Machado dedicated another poem to the saber of the rebel Generalissimo Francisco Franco.

The idea of a divided Spain, each half antagonistic to the other half, dates back at least to 19th-century Spanish satirist Mariano José de Larra, who, in his article "All Souls' Day 1836" ["Día de difuntos de 1836"] wrote "Here lies half of Spain. It died of the other half." Later, philosopher Miguel de Unamuno, Machado's contemporary, developed the idea through the Biblical story of Jacob and Esau struggling for dominance in their mother's womb, as in the article "Rebeca" (1914), which may pre-date Machado's quatrain. But historians trace the idea still further back, to the 17th and 18th centuries and the formation of the Spanish character.

Historian Charles J. Esdaile describes Machado's "two Spains" as "the one clerical, absolutist and reactionary, and the other secular, constitutional and progressive," but views this picture of the first Spain as "far too simplistic", in that it lumps the enlightened absolutism of the 18th century Bourbon monarchs with the reactionary politics that simply wanted to restore the "untrammeled enjoyment" of the privileges of the Church and aristocracy. In addition, he states that the populacho—the mass of the common people "pursuing a dimly perceived agenda of their own"—were not loyal to any of these on any long term basis.

See also
Corruption in Spain
:es:¡Vivan las cadenas!

References

External links

Original Spanish-language text of Machado's poem

Historiography of Spain
Phrases
Political history of Spain
Spanish Civil War poems